Omer Karime Ali Riza (born 8 November 1979) is a former footballer who is a coach at Watford's academy.

Riza, who played as a forward, featured for English clubs Arsenal and West Ham United, Holland's Ado Den Haag and Turkish outfits Trabzonspor & Denizlispor within his footballing career.

Riza was also capped for the Turkish A2 team on one occasion.

Playing career
Born in Edmonton, London, of Turkish Cypriot descent, Riza started his career as a youth with English club Arsenal and made his first team debut on 2 November 1998 against Derby County in the League Cup. He also travelled with the team on away fixtures against Dynamo Kyiv and Panathinaikos as a substitute in the UEFA Champions League. With few first team opportunities at Arsenal, during the 1998–99 season, he went on loan to ADO Den Haag for three months.

In the 1999–2000 season, he moved to West Ham United, but again was unable to break into the first team. He went on loan to Barnet and Cambridge United, and signed a permanent deal with the latter in 2002. During the 2002–03 season he scored 17 goals for United, which prompted a move to Süper Lig side Denizlispor during the 2003 close season. In January 2006, he signed for Trabzonspor. In January 2008 Riza walked out of the club claiming he had not been paid. The Turkish Football Federation banned him from playing for any club.

In February 2009, Riza returned to English football with a trial at League Two club Shrewsbury Town, and impressed manager Paul Simpson, but Riza could not take part in any official matches due to the ban imposed upon him by the TFF. The players legal representatives submitted a case to football's World governing body FIFA in early April 2009, from which a Swiss judge over-ruled the TFF decision, on 17 April, that Riza shall be allowed to compete in English football. Riza made his debut for Shrewsbury Town as a second-half substitute against Rotherham United the following day. The case with the club and TFF continues, with the player and his legal team awaiting for FIFA to make a decision on the restriction.

On 22 January 2010, he left Shrewsbury Town after struggling to break into the first team during the first half of the season, with Riza and the club coming to an agreement regarding paying off the rest of his contract. On 25 February he joined Aldershot Town until the end of the season. Following the appointment of David Livermore as manager at Histon, Riza joined Histon on a non-contract basis and made his debut against Kettering Town in a Conference National fixture on 28 August. He scored his first goal for Histon when he scored a penalty in their league match against Hayes & Yeading United, which turned out to be the winning goal. Due to the financial cost of his wages, Histon released Riza in January 2012, giving him seven days notice to leave the club.

In February 2012, Riza signed for Boreham Wood scoring on his debut in a 3–0 win against Maidenhead United. On 28 January 2013 he signed for Chelmsford City and scored on his debut on the same day against Dorchester Town in a 4–0 win, being named Man of the Match.

In August 2015, Riza signed for Harlow Town, hoping to bounce back from a knee injury.

In December 2017, Riza came out of retirement, signing for Eastern Counties League Premier Division side Newmarket Town as a player. One month later, Riza left Newmarket due to injury.

On 1 January 2022, 42-year-old Riza played for Hertford Town in the Southern Football League.

Coaching career
In August 2013, Riza moved clubs again, this time signing for Cheshunt. Following the departure of manager Tony Faulkner, Riza was appointed as caretaker manager of Cheshunt. The holder of a UEFA A Licence badge, Riza said of his new role, "It's new to me but I am ready for the challenge. I am ready for the next step of my career. I have always wanted to go into this side of the game. I feel quietly confident I have what it takes to build something." His first game in charge was on 31 August 2013, an away game against Hertford Town in the FA Cup. Riza scored to make the game 3–1 before they finally lost 4–2. His player-manager position was made permanent in November 2013. He scored 17 goals during that season, but damaged his cruciate ligament in one of his knees in a charity match for Arsenal XI in June 2014, sidelining him for 15 months. He was sacked from his Cheshunt duties in September 2014.

He had a short spell as assistant manager for Heybridge Swifts, between December 2014 and February 2015.

On 30 March 2017, following the resignation of Daniel Webb as manager of Leyton Orient, Riza was promoted from his role as assistant manager and placed in charge until the end of the 2016–17 season. In his first game as manager, on 1 April, Orient lost 0–2 to Wycombe Wanderers and Riza was sent to the stands for verbally abusing referee Charles Breakspear. On 22 April 2017, after losing to Crewe Alexandra, Orient were relegated to the National League, ending the club's 112 years in the Football League. Riza's contract expired on 30 June 2017 and was not extended.

In August 2018, Riza joined Watford as an academy coach. In September 2019, Riza was named as a coach for the England U16s as part of The FA's 2019–20 Elite Coach Placement Programme. In October 2020 he was confirmed as the Watford's under-23 coach, having stepped up temporarily into the role in December 2019 after Hayden Mullins was promoted to the club's first-team staff.

On 26 August 2021, Riza was confirmed as an assistant coach for the England U17s working with Tom Curtis and Paul Davis.

Managerial statistics

References

External links

1979 births
Living people
Footballers from Edmonton, London
English footballers
Turkish footballers
Turkey B international footballers
Association football forwards
Arsenal F.C. players
ADO Den Haag players
West Ham United F.C. players
Barnet F.C. players
Cambridge United F.C. players
Denizlispor footballers
Trabzonspor footballers
Shrewsbury Town F.C. players
Aldershot Town F.C. players
Histon F.C. players
Boreham Wood F.C. players
English Football League players
National League (English football) players
Isthmian League players
Southern Football League players
Süper Lig players
English expatriate footballers
Expatriate footballers in the Netherlands
Cheshunt F.C. players
Sportspeople of Turkish Cypriot descent
Chelmsford City F.C. players
Harlow Town F.C. players
English football managers
Turkish football managers
Leyton Orient F.C. managers
English Football League managers
Newmarket Town F.C. players
Watford F.C. non-playing staff
Hertford Town F.C. players
English people of Turkish Cypriot descent
English people of Turkish descent
Association football coaches